Villa Campanile is a village in Tuscany, central Italy, administratively a frazione of the comune of Castelfranco di Sotto, province of Pisa. At the time of the 2001 census its population was 271.

Villa Campanile is about 38 km from Pisa and 16 km from Castelfranco di Sotto.

References 

Frazioni of the Province of Pisa